Thelonious Sphere Monk (1917–1982) was an American jazz pianist.

Thelonious Sphere Monk or Thelonious Monk may also refer to:
 T. S. Monk or Thelonious Sphere Monk III (born 1949), son of Thelonious Monk
 Thelonious Sphere Monk: Dreaming of the Masters Series Vol. 2, a 1991 tribute album
 Thelonious Monk Institute of Jazz, a Washington, D.C. charity established 1986

See also
 Thelonious, a given name
 Thelonious Monk discography, includes albums with "Thelonious Monk" in the title